Anne Wentworth was a seventeenth-century English prophetess and writer. Although a poor woman, she found followers and a patron prepared to fund the publishing of her religious writing. She was separated from her husband; their unstable relationship being the cause of her prophecies.

Early years
Most of what is known about Anne Wentworth has been derived from her four extant texts, which are autobiographical in nature. They do not give specific details of her early life but do suggest that she was born into a Lincolnshire family between 1629 and 1630.

Career
In 1652/1653, she married William Wentworth of London (Gill 115). In the late 1660s, Wentworth gave birth to a daughter (Taft). Several years later, around 1670, Wentworth experienced a restoration of faith in God after eighteen years in her unhappy marriage. After this "visitation" from God, Wentworth spent almost seven years writing and perfecting her craft, before publishing her first work, a pamphlet entitled, A True Account of Anne Wentworth's Being Cruelly, Unjustly, and Unchristianly Dealt with by Some of Those People Called Anabaptists (1676), more commonly referred to as A True Account of Anne Wentworth (Taft). In this piece, Wentworth reflects on the patriarchal domination of her husband, understanding it as punishment from God (Taft).

Despite the seven years it took for Wentworth to finally publish her first work, her life as a prophetess did not go unrecognized (Taft). Her husband and fellow Anabaptist comrades (today referred to as Baptists) began to persecute Wentworth during this time as she expressed her prophetic voice. In 1675, it is unclear whether Wentworth was excommunicated from their church after writing critiques on it (Gill 115) or whether she left it of her own free will (Taft); however, it is clear that the abuse from her husband and fellow Anabaptists intensified after she no longer belonged to their local church.

In 1677, Wentworth published A Vindication of Anne Wentworth, another autobiographical work like A True Account that attempts to "justify her prophetic voice as genuine, narrate the persecution inflicted upon her because of her prophetic activity, and predict the imminent coming of the Apocalypse" (Taft). At this time, she also sent letters to King Charles II and the Lord Mayor of London relating the coming Apocalypse "before New Year's Day, 1678" (Taft). This enraged her husband who enlisted the help of three of his cousins to remove Wentworth from her home in the summer of 1677 (Taft). And despite the decline in her popularity after her prophecy did not come true, Anne continued to write England's Spiritual Pill, which "may have appeared in 1678, but its publication date is uncertain" (Taft) and The Revelation of Jesus Christ, which was meant to record "the actual words Christ ... spoke to her" that incited her prophetic voice. This text also acts as proof that someone still supported her after 1678 due to the line, "Friend in love to Souls" that is recognized on the work's title page, recognizing the individual who financed its publication in 1679. That same year, Wentworth returned to her home.

After The Revelation of Jesus Christ however, no other texts have been uncovered written by Wentworth. Her voice fell silent and there is some speculation that she is the Anne Wentworth who went on to live "in St John's Court and was buried on 22 May 1693 at St James's Church, Clerkenwell" (Gill 115), but there is no confirmation on this.

During the time that Wentworth wrote, the fact that her pieces were published and she was recognized as a public figure of her community is astonishing. Her works not only spoke out against her husband but they were also religiously and politically charged—a dangerous combination for a woman of the time. Due to her departure from what was traditionally accepted behavior for women of her time, Wentworth's life was tainted by chaos and persecution. Despite this however, she persevered and was able to write and publish the work that was significant to her—a truly remarkable feat for a woman of her time.

Selected works

A True Account of Anne Wentworth (1676)
A True Account of Anne Wentworth was published in 1676. It was the first published work by Wentworth. Its full title is A True Account of Anne Wentworths Being cruelly, unjustly, and unchristianly dealt with by some of those people called Anabaptists. It is a seventeen-page pamphlet that describes an account of her eighteen years spent with her suppressive husband. It is a fairly vague description of the actual abuses her husband acted against her but it does claim she came very close to death, caused by her husband's treatment, only to be saved by God. She also describes the threats and suppressing behavior of the fellow Anabaptists of her town. In her True Account, Wentworth proclaims God as her one true savior and Christianity as the one true religion (Wentworth, Freeman). She describes leaving her heavenly husband for God as her Spiritual Bridegroom (Gillespie).

A Vindication of Anne Wentworth (1677)
A Vindication of Anne Wentworth published in 1677 was Wentworth's second work. In this pamphlet Wentworth goes into greater detail about her abuse by her husband and the Anabaptists. She also prophesizes the upcoming apocalypse God has promised. In A Vindication Wentworth states that she is not seeking revenge and hopes her husband will be saved himself. She ensures that she was an unwilling party in her writings and only by the fear of God's imminent power did she expose her husband's wrongdoings. Wentworth concludes with a poem about her mistreatment, her innocence, and the forthcoming apocalypse that will punish London for her sins (Wentworth, Freeman).

Englands Spiritual Pill (1679)
Published in 1679, this is the last of Anne Wentworth's known works.  The complete title to this piece is ENGLANDS SPIRITUAL PILL Which will Purge, Cure, or Kill; DECLARING The Great and Wonderfull Things WHICH The Almighty and most High God JESUS CHRIST King of Kings, and Lord of Lords, Hath Revealed unto ANNE WENTWORTH CONCERNING A Through-Reformation of Church-worship, from all Hypocritical and Idolatrous Formalities, the downfall of Babylon, and the finishing of her Testimony.

Similar to A Revelation of Jesus Christ, this piece too, deals with the encounters between Jesus Christ and Anne Wentworth.  She says that because of the success of her first book, she has a continued duty to enlighten people before the wrath of God is upon them.

A Revelation of Jesus Christ (1679)
"Just as he spake it in Verses at several times, and sometimes in Prose, unto his Faithful Servant, Anne Wentworth, who suffereth for his Name" (Freeman 693).

A Revelation of Jesus Christ, published in 1679, is the text in which Wentworth records the conversations she had with Christ from 1677 to 1679.  Within the text she advises friends to awake and speak the truth of God, but it appears they seem doubtful of her prophecies, prompting Wentworth to write "For when the Lord of Life sends in love to warn you,/ Ye slight his Word, because his Voice ye never knew" (Freeman 701).  This launches the discussion between Wentworth and Christ about how the ignorant people around her will suffer when the end of the world arrives.

References

Bibliography
Freeman, Curtis W. Company of Women Preachers: Baptist Prophetesses in Seventeenth-Century England. Waco: Baylor University Press, 2011.
Gill, Catie. “Wentworth, Anne.” Oxford Dictionary of National Biography. Ed. H.C.G. Matthew, Brian 
Harrison. Vol. 58. New York: Oxford University Press, 2004. Print.
Gillespie, Katharine. Domesticity and Dissent in the Seventeenth Century: English Women's Writing and the Public Sphere. Cambridge University Press, 2004.
Taft, Vickie. "Anne Wentworth's Life and Works." Emory Women Writers Resource Project. Emory University, 2005. Web. 11 March 2014.

Year of birth missing
Year of death missing
17th-century English women writers
17th-century English writers
Prophets